Geirmund is a given name. Notable people with the given name include:

Geirmund Brendesæter (born 1970), Norwegian footballer
Geirmund Ihle (1934–2016), Norwegian politician
 Geirmund Simonsen, musician
Geirmund the Noisy (died 978), Viking adventurer of the 10th century